Ponnaiyah Ramajayam Institute of Science and Technology (PRIST) is a private and deemed university in Vallam Thanjavur, India. The institute offers undergraduate and postgraduate courses in Engineering, Science, Education, Management, Arts, and Law, as well as research programmes. The institute has campuses in Trichy, Kumbakonam, Puducherry, Chennai, and Madurai. Ponnaiyah Ramajayam Institutions is a group of colleges in Tamil Nadu.

History
The institute  was founded in 1994 by Prof. P. Murugesan. It  was initially known as the Institute of Computer Science and Technology. Murugesan founded the institute to introduce computer education to the Thanjavur District. Soon thereafter, the institute received affiliation from Bharathidasan University to offer postgraduate diploma programmes in computer applications.

Thereafter it expanded to include an Arts and Science College, College of Engineering and Technology, College of Education, Research Institution, and Polytechnic College.

In 2004, Ponnappan Ramajayam College applied for NAAC assessment and accreditation and was awarded an "A" grade, thus making it the first "A" grade awarded college in the Bharathidasan University area. The college then submitted its proposal to the Ministry of Human Resource Development, Government of India for deemed university status.

On 4 January 2008, the institute was conferred deemed university status based on the recommendations of the UGC Expert Committee, the Ministry of HRD, and the Government of India. The institute also received approval from the Distance Education Council (DEC) and its B.Ed. course is approved by The National Council for Teacher Education (NCTE).

In 2015, the institute once again applied for NAAC assessment and accreditation and was awarded a "B" grade. In a letter signed by an undersecretary in the Union Health Ministry, it was stated that the institute, which was granted conditional approval to offer 150 MBBS seats last year, was debarred from admitting students for the academic years of 2017–18 and 2018–19.

Currently, the institute offers degrees in medicine, engineering, arts & science, education, law ,pharmacy, management, and technology, as well as Ph.D. programmes in some of these fields. Ponnaiyah Ramajayam Medical College and Hospital is situated in Nallur, ECR road, Chennai.

Admission
Admission to the Institute for Engineering courses is based on student performance on the All-India Engineering Entrance Examination. For other courses, admission is based on performance in previous relevant academic courses. To be eligible for admission, students need to pass 10 for diploma courses and 10+2 examination with physics and mathematics as compulsory subjects, along with one of either chemistry, biotechnology, biology, or a technical vocational subject. Students are required to score at least 45% (or 40% for candidates belonging to the reserved category) in the above subjects taken together.

Campuses

Thanjavur West 

The Thanjavur West Campus is the main campus. It covers more than 100 acres of land with a built-up area of over 1,500,000 square feet (or 150,000 square metres). It houses a population of over 5,000 students with more than 20 blocks and two boys' hostels. The entire campus is Wi-Fi enabled with 8 Mbit/s internet for usage by students and faculty staff. A central admin block is the most modern and biggest building where most of the top-level university executive chambers are situated.

Thanjavur East 

The Thanjavur East Campus is located approximately 15 km east of the main campus and covers 70 acres. It contains several blocks for undergraduate and postgraduate level courses in the fields of science, humanities, pharmacy and management, as well as a girls' hostel that houses over 1000 students. It contains a well-stocked library and many indoor and outdoor sports facilities.

Student activities

Clubs
 PRIST Cyber Tech Club – One of the oldest clubs, which organises events, lectures, presentation and workshops on recent trends, developments and emerging technologies in the field of Computer Science.
 Shakespeare Club
 C. V. Raman Club
 PRIST Micro-Biology Club 
 PRIST Bio-Chemistry Club         
 PRIST Bio Clout Club 
 PRIST Nature Club
 PRIST Green Cell
 Ramanujan Mathematics Club

Associations
 PRIST Athletic Association
 PRIST Chemistry Association
 Milton English Literary Association
 PRIST Fine Arts Association
 Amateur Marketing Managers Association

Festivals
 Food Fest – An annual one-day food festival organised by the institute with a focus on South Indian foods.
 PRIST Kamban Kazhagam

Technical certifications 
 Database course from Oracle Corporation (OCA) – This course is available to all students studying circuit branches, and is mandatory for students studying for a B.Tech. in Computer Science. It is created in partnership with Oracle University with certified faculties and course material supplied by Oracle.
 Networking course from Cisco Systems (CCNA) – 2nd year Engineering students of circuit branches are required to study this course, created in partnership with Cisco System to provide course materials and training certifications to students and faculty staff.
 SAP Partner (for undergraduate and postgraduate students)
 SolidWorks
 CATIA
 Matlab
 GRE/GMAT/GATE – Up-to-date preparation kits are available at the library for students who is seeking higher studies in India and abroad.

References

External links 

 
 UGC affiliation details

Education in Thanjavur district
Engineering colleges in Tamil Nadu
Thanjavur
Educational institutions established in 1985
1994 establishments in Tamil Nadu